Agathe Sorel (born 1935, Budapest) is a London-based artist of Hungarian descent, specializing in painting, sculpture, printmaking and livres d’artiste. She is a Member of the Royal Watercolour Society and the Royal Society of Painter-Printmakers, as well as a founding member of the Printmakers Council and was its Chairman in 1981-1983. She was one of the first artists who experimented with making objects and sculptures using print techniques.

Life 
Agathe Sorel was born in 1935 in Budapest.  She studied at the Academy of Applied Arts and Academy of Fine Arts in Budapest. In 1956, she left Hungary with her mother because of the anti-Soviet revolution and settled in England. The same year she enrolled at the Camberwell School of Art in London. At Camberwell she spent about a year and a half and met many interesting artists there, including Michael Rothenstein, Robert Medley, R.B. Kitaj, Heinz Inlander, Julian Trevelyan, and Anthony Gross. In 1958 Sorel won Gulbenkian Scholarship and moved to Paris for two years to study at the Ecoles des Beaux Arts, the Sorbonne and etching under Stanley William Hayter at Atelier 17.

Career 
After returning to London in 1960, Sorel set up her own studio in Fulham with her husband, painter and designer Gabor Sitkey, and began teaching at Camberwell and Maidstone Colleges. In 1965, she became a founding member of the Printmaker’s Council. The following year, in 1966, Sorel won a Churchill fellowship to travel to the United States and Mexico for two years. After that, she became interested in working with transparent materials and the use of Perspex allowed her to combine line engraving properties with 3D forms. Most of her sculpture is engineered Perspex with both hand and machine engraving.

In 1981-1983 Sorel chaired the Printmaker’s Council.

In collaboration with the poet David Gascoyne Sorel made an artist book The Book of Sand published in 2001. The book was a mixture of poetry and printed drawings.

Her work was featured in several exhibitions at key galleries and museums, including the Bankside Gallery.

Exhibitions (selection) 
 1965 – Solo show at Curwen Gallery, London
 1967 – Exhibition at the Ben Uri Gallery, London
 1967 - Arleigh Gallery, San Francisco
 1968 – Solo show at Philadelphia Print Club
 1974 – Line in Space by Agathe Sorel, Camden Arts Centre
 1975 – Solo show at Oxford University Press
 1978 – Solo show at Robertson Galleries, Ottawa
 1980 – Solo show at the Comsky Gallery, Los Angeles
 1989 – Space Engravings & other works by Agathe Sorel, Herbert Read Gallery, Kent Institute of Art & Design
 1992 – Malargalleriet, Stockholm,
 1995 – Stadtische Galerie, Filderstadt, Stuttgart
 2000/2002 – Solo shows at Galerie La Hune, Paris
 2002 – Catalana Blanca, Bankside Gallery, London
 2003 – The Book of Sand, Bankside Gallery, London
 2004 – Retrospective Bradford Museum Cartwright Hall
 2005 – Livres d’artiste at the Bradford Museum Cartwright Hall
 2006 – Solo exhibition at Lawrence Graham LLP London
 2009 – Solo exhibition at the Nehru Centre, London
 2012 – Solo exhibition at the Bradford Museum, Cartwright Hall
 2014 – Retrospective exhibition at Studio of Contemporary Art, London

Collections (selection) 
 The Tate Gallery, London
 Victoria and Albert Museum, London
 British Museum, London
 British Council, London
 Museum of Fine Art, Philadelphia
 Boston Museum of Fine Art
 Harvard Art Museum, Cambridge, MA
 Art Institute of Chicago
 Gregory Allicar Museum of Art, Colorado State University
 Museum of Contemporary Art, Skopje
 National Library, Paris

References

External links 
 Official webpage

Living people
1935 births
20th-century Hungarian women artists
21st-century Hungarian women artists
Artists from Budapest
Atelier 17 alumni
English sculptors
English women artists
Hungarian emigrants to the United Kingdom
Hungarian sculptors
Women printmakers
20th-century English women
20th-century English people
21st-century English women
21st-century English people